Duncan Township was a civil township in Cheboygan County in the U.S. state of Michigan. It was first established on August 23, 1854.  As the second township in the county, it consisted of all parts east of the Cheboygan River.  Portions of this township were later incorporated into Benton Township in 1871, and Grant Township in 1879.  The remnants of Duncan Township were combined with and incorporated into Benton Township on March 7, 1887.

References

Defunct townships in Michigan
Former populated places in Cheboygan County, Michigan
1854 establishments in Michigan
1887 disestablishments in the United States
Populated places established in 1854
Populated places disestablished in 1887